This is a list of monuments in Siraha District, Nepal as officially recognized by and available through the website of the Department of Archaeology, Nepal.

List of monuments

|}

See also 
 List of monuments in Province No. 2
 List of monuments in Nepal

References 

Siraha